Old Post Office is a historic post office building located at Oneonta in Otsego County, New York, United States. It was built in 1915, and is one of a number of post offices in New York State designed by the Office of the Supervising Architect of the Treasury Department, Oscar Wenderoth.   The original portion of the building is nearly square, seven bays on each side.  It is built of Indiana limestone, with Concord granite trim in the Classical Revival style.  It features a giant portico supported by six massive Corinthian order columns.  In 1980, the building housed city offices moved from the Old City Hall.

It was listed on the National Register of Historic Places in 1988. It is located within the Oneonta Downtown Historic District established in 2003.

References

Oneonta
Government buildings completed in 1915
Neoclassical architecture in New York (state)
Buildings and structures in Otsego County, New York
National Register of Historic Places in Otsego County, New York
Individually listed contributing properties to historic districts on the National Register in New York (state)